Ninurta-kudurrῑ-uṣur I, “Ninurta protect my offspring/border” (the ambiguity may be intentional),  983–981 BC, was the second king of the Bῑt-Bazi or 6th Dynasty of Babylon and he reigned for three years, according to the King List A, while the Dynastic Chronicle records that he ruled for just two years. This was during an era of economic and political retrenchment.

Biography

A fragment of the Assyrian Synchronistic King List names Ashur-nirari IV as his contemporary, rather than Ashur-rabi II who better matches the chronology currently favored. Two Luristan arrowheads are inscribed with his name, and were probably votive offerings for temples, but there is a remote possibility that these belong to his later name-sake, who ruled for less than a year.
 
The Bīt-Abi-Rattaš kudurru from the reign of Nabû-mukin-apli,  974–939 BC, begins with a recollection of an earlier legal document from Kār-Marduk, which may have been his capital, dated to his second year. It concerns a manslaughter settlement, where one Arad-Sibitti has killed the female slave of Buruša the bow-maker, ironically with an arrow. The king pronounced judgement and commanded Arad-Sibitta to give the plaintiff seven slaves in compensation and this was witnessed by seven high-ranking witnesses,  of whom three were of Kassite origin and one, Ammenna, the officer, a Hurrian.
 
He may be represented by the eleventh king in the Prophecy A whose rule likewise endures for three years. This describes the apocalyptic events of the king’s reign with cities being destroyed, rebellion, hostility against Akkad, disconnection from the rites at the Ekur and Nippur, and fragmentary but ominous events involving the Amurru and weapons. He was succeeded by his brother Širikti-Šuqamuna.

Inscriptions

Notes

References

 

10th-century BC Babylonian kings
10th-century BC rulers